= Chicharrón preparado =

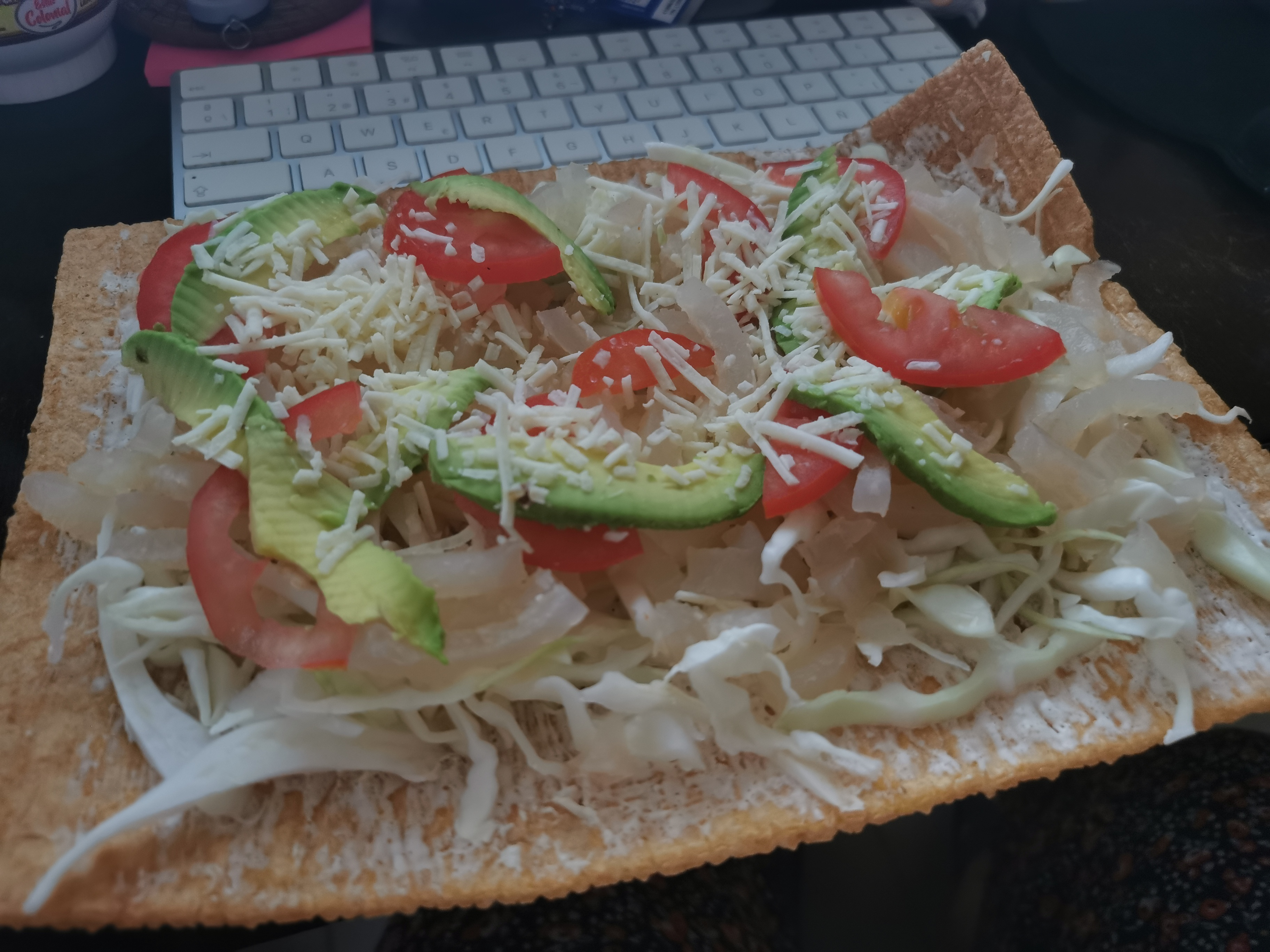
- Place of origin: Mexico
- Region or state: Mexico city
- Main ingredients: wheat flour, cabbage, cucumber, avocado

Chicharrón preparado is a Mexican dish, originally from Mexico City and now found in various states of the republic. It consists of a rectangle of cooked wheat flour with a firm structure, onto which ingredients are added. It is a type of wheat flour antojito prepared on top of ready-made chicharrón de harina, spread with cream, topped with a bed of shredded cabbage, tomato, lettuce, cucumber and avocado, and optionally, pork rinds and a squeeze of lime.
